Hester Varian (1828 – 15 April 1898) was an Irish poet and novelist.

Biography
Hester Varian was born in Cork in 1828. Her father was Amos Varian. In 1865 she married George Sigerson. They had four children. Hester, Dora, William and George. Both sons died young.

Varian came from a republican and nationalist family. She wrote for Harp, Cork Examiner, Irish Fireside, Young Ireland, and others. Her only novel, published in 1889, was A Ruined Race. Varian died in Dublin and is buried in Glasnevin Cemetery.

Sources

1828 births
1898 deaths
19th-century Irish novelists
19th-century Irish poets
19th-century Irish women writers
Irish women novelists
Irish women poets
People from Cork (city)
Burials at Glasnevin Cemetery